Ramiro de Maeztu y Whitney (May 4, 1875 – October 29, 1936) was a prolific Spanish essayist, journalist and publicist. His early literary work adscribes him to the Generation of '98. Adept to Nietzschean and Social Darwinist ideas in his youth, he became close to Fabian socialism and later to distributism and social corporatism during his spell as correspondent in London from where he chronicled the Great War. During the years of the Primo de Rivera dictatorship he served as Ambassador to Argentina. A staunch militarist, he became at the end of his ideological path one of the most prominent far-right theorists against the Spanish Republic, leading the reactionary voices calling for a military coup. A member of the cultural group Acción Española, he spread the concept of "Hispanidad" (Spanishness). Imprisoned by Republican authorities after the outbreak of the Spanish Civil War, he was killed by leftist militiamen during a saca in the midst of the conflict.

Early life and career
Ramiro de Maeztu y Whitney was born on May 4, 1875 in Vitoria, the capital of Alava province. He was the son of Manuel de Maeztu Rodriguez, a Cuban engineer and landowner born in Cienfuegos with ancestry from Navarre. While in Paris, he had met her mother, Juana Whitney, born in Nice and daughter of a British diplomat, when she was 16 years old.

He was among the young Spanish intellectuals deeply affected by their country's humiliating defeat in the Spanish–American War of 1898, along with José Martínez Ruiz ("Azorín"), Pío Baroja and others forming the literary Generation of '98. His first collection of essays was published in 1898 under the name Hacia otra España ("Towards a Different Spain").

An early advocate of socialism, he became disillusioned by the Great War while he was serving as the London correspondent for several Spanish newspapers and travelled in France and Germany.

Move to right
After returning to Spain, Maeztu rejected many of his friends and argued that human reason alone was not enough to solve social problems, and he argued for the importance of strong authority and tradition rooted in the Roman Catholic Church. Those ideas were embodied in his 1916 book, Authority, Liberty, and Function in the Light of the War, first published in English and later in Spanish as La Crisis del Humanismo (1919).

Maeztu became one of the most prominent defenders of the regime of Miguel Primo de Rivera and called for Spain to "recover its 16th-century sense of Roman Catholic mission". In 1926, his literary essays were published in Don Quijote, Don Juan y La Celestina, and in 1928, he served as Spanish ambassador to Argentina.

In 1930, he joined the National Monarchist Union, the successor party to Primo de Rivera's Patriotic Union, along other defenders of the dictatorship such as the son of the dictator José Antonio and the former ministers José Calvo Sotelo and Eduardo Callejo de la Cuesta.

Along with Pedro Sainz Rodríguez and others, Maeztu founded the monarchist political movement Acción Española in 1931. In 1934, his final published book was written, Defensa de la hispanidad ("In Defense of Spanishness"), which advocated "a return to pure Spanishness" and strongly condemned liberalism and the French Revolution's slogan "liberty, equality, fraternity", which he countered by his own motto, duty, hierarchy, and humanity. He thought of Spanishness as a spiritual world that united Spain and its former colonies by the Spanish language and Catholicism, with rationalism and democracy being supposedly alien to the Hispanic ethos.

Since 1932, he made it constant in several articles for Acción Española and the ABC newspaper, his admiration for Adolf Hitler, also showing himself to be a supporter of the anti-Semitism of the Nazi Party. Also from the pages of ABC, he came to express his desire that a nationalist movement similar to Hitler's would triumph in Spain to confront democracy and Marxism, asking the extremist José María Albiñana to lead the project.[23]

Death and legacy

On October 29, 1936, Maeztu was executed by Republican soldiers in the early days of the Spanish Civil War near Madrid. These last words are attributed to him: "You do not know why you kill me, but I know why I'm dying: for your children to be better than you!" His political thoughts had a profound influence on the Chilean historian Jaime Eyzaguirre.

His younger sister was the Spanish educator and feminist, María de Maeztu, who founded the Residencia de Señoritas and the Lyceum Club in Madrid, and his younger brother was the painter Gustavo de Maeztu, who has a museum named after him in the Palace of the Kings of Navarre in Estella, Spain.

The Spanish philosopher José Ortega y Gasset dedicated his book Meditations on Quixote (1914) to Maeztu — "A Ramiro de Maeztu, con un gesto fraternal."

Works
 (1899). Hacia otra España
 (1911). La Revolución y los Intelectuales
 (1916). Inglaterra en Armas
 (1919). La Crisis del Humanismo
 (1920). Del Espíritu de los Vascos
 (1926). Don Quijote, Don Juan y La Celestina
 (1934). Defensa de la Hispanidad 
 (1935). La Brevedad de la Vida en la Poesía Lírica Española

Works in English translation

 "Expressionism," The New Age, Vol. XIV, No. 4, 1913, pp. 122–123.
 "England and Germany: Two Types of Culture," The New Age, Vol. XVI, No. 12, 1915, pp. 303–304.
 "On Belgian Nationality," The New Age, Vol. XVI, No. 14, 1915, pp. 372–374.
 "On Marx and Wealth and Power," The New Age, Vol. XVI, No. 16, 1915, pp. 423–424.
 "What is a Nation?," The New Age, Vol. XVI, No. 16, 1915, p. 436.
 "The Bellicose Pacifists," The New Age, Vol. XVI, No. 18, 1915, pp. 481–482.
 "Bureaucracy and War," The New Age, Vol. XVI, No. 20, 1915, pp. 530–532.
 "Death and Resurrection," The New Age, Vol. XVI, No. 22, 1915, pp. 583–584.
 "On Art and Luxury," The New Age, Vol. XVI, No. 24, 1915, pp. 640–642.
 "The Jealousy of the Guilds," The New Age, Vol. XVI, No. 26, 1915, pp. 687–688.
 "On Luxury and Waste," The New Age, Vol. XVII, No. 2, 1915, pp. 34–35.
 "War and Solidarity," The New Age, Vol. XVII, No. 4, 1915, pp. 81–83.
 "On Novels and Happiness," The New Age, Vol. XVII, No. 6, 1915, pp. 129–131.
 "The Natural Defence of Luxury," The New Age, Vol. XVII, No. 6, 1915, pp. 141–142.
 "On Compulsion," The New Age, Vol. XVII, No. 8, 1915, pp. 179–181.
 "Art and Utility," The New Age, Vol. XVII, No. 9, 1915, p. 215.
 "Not Happiness, But...," The New Age, Vol. XVII, No. 10, 1915, pp. 224–226.
 "On Liberty of Thought," The New Age, Vol. XVII, No. 12, 1915, pp. 273–274.
 "Happiness and Beauty," The New Age, Vol. XVII, No. 12, 1915, pp. 294–295.
 "On Love and Veracity," The New Age, Vol. XVII, No. 14, 1915, pp. 330–332.
 "On Liberty and Organization," The New Age, Vol. XVII, No. 16, 1915, pp. 377–378.
 "The Historical Function of England," The New Age, Vol. XVII, No. 17, 1915, p. 411.
 "Beyond the Barriers of Liberty and Authority," The New Age, Vol. XVII, No. 17, 1915, pp. 424–425.
 "The Historical Function of England," The New Age, Vol. XVII, No. 19, 1915, p. 460.
 "On Law and the Guilds," The New Age, Vol. XVII, No. 20, 1915, pp. 472–473.
 "The End of Romanticism," The New Age, Vol. XVII, No. 22, 1915, pp. 521–522.
 "The Historical Function of England," The New Age, Vol. XVII, No. 23, 1915, p. 558.
 "On a Doctrine of Power," The New Age, Vol. XVII, No. 24, 1915, pp. 565–567.
 "On the Primacy of Things," The New Age, Vol. XVII, No. 26, 1915, pp. 617–619.
 "On the Balance of Power," The New Age, Vol. XVIII, No. 2, 1915, pp. 31–32.
 "On the Legal Principles of the Human Commonwealth," The New Age, Vol. XVIII, No. 4, 1915, pp. 78–80.
 "On the Economic Interpretation of History," The New Age, Vol. XVIII, No. 6, 1915, pp. 128–130.
 "On Right and Might," The New Age, Vol. XVIII, No. 8, 1915, pp. 178–180.

 "On Right and Might II," The New Age, Vol. XVIII, No. 10, 1916, pp. 224–226.
 "The German Heresy: The Man of the Renaissance," The New Age, Vol. XVIII, No. 12, 1916, pp. 273–275.
 "The German Heresy: The State as Necessity," The New Age, Vol. XVIII, No. 14, 1916, pp. 320–322.
 "The German Heresy: The State as the Good," The New Age, Vol. XVIII, No. 16, 1916, pp. 368–369.
 "The German Heresy: Hegel and the State," The New Age, Vol. XVIII, No. 18, 1916, pp. 417–418.
 "Disconnected Connections," The New Age, Vol. XVIII, No. 20, 1916, pp. 466–468.
 "On the Primacy of Things," The New Age, Vol. XVIII, No. 22, 1916, pp. 514–516.
 "More Disconnected Connections," The New Age, Vol. XVIII, No. 24, 1916, pp. 561–562.
 "The Primacy of Things," The New Age, Vol. XVIII, No. 24, 1916, p. 574.
 "A Reflection upon Sin," The New Age, Vol. XIX, No. 1, 1916, pp. 9–10.
 "The Primacy of Things," The New Age, Vol. XIX, No. 1, 1916, p. 22.
 "The Object of the War," The New Age, Vol. XIX, No. 2, 1916, p. 46.
 "On Functions and Values," The New Age, Vol. XIX, No. 3, 1916, pp. 57–58. 
 "Authority, Liberty and Function," The New Age, Vol. XIX, No. 5, 1916, pp. 104–105.
 "The Confusions of Mr. Bernard Shaw," The New Age, Vol. XIX, No. 7, 1916, pp. 152–154.
 "The So-Called Law of Rent," The New Age, Vol. XIX, No. 7, 1916, pp. 198–199.
 "Mr. Shaw and the German Republic," The New Age, Vol. XIX, No. 13, 1916, pp. 294–297.
 "Independence & Interdependence," The New Age, Vol. XIX, No. 15, 1916, p. 344. 
 "A Visit to the Front: Train and Steamer," The New Age, Vol. XIX, No. 21, 1916, pp. 486–487.
 "A Visit to the Front: The Sanitary Service," The New Age, Vol. XIX, No. 22, 1916, pp. 510–511.
 "A Visit to the Front: The Joy of War," The New Age, Vol. XIX, No. 23, 1916, pp. 533–534.
 "A Visit to the Front: The New British Tactics," The New Age, Vol. XIX, No. 24, 1916, pp. 557–559.
 "A Visit to the Front: A Military Base," The New Age, Vol. XIX, No. 25, 1916, pp. 580–581.
 "A Visit to the Front: On the North of the Somme," The New Age, Vol. XIX, No. 26, 1916, pp. 604–605.
 "A Visit to the Front: The English in France," The New Age, Vol. XX, No. 1, 1916, pp. 5–7.
 "A Visit to the Front: Salisbury Camp," The New Age, Vol. XX, No. 2, 1916, p. 29. 
 "A Visit to the Front: The Production of Munitions," The New Age, Vol. XX, No. 3, 1916, pp. 53–54.
 "A Visit to the Front: Final Impression," The New Age, Vol. XX, No. 4, 1916, pp. 77–78.
 "On Power and Things," The New Age, Vol. XX, No. 7, 1916, pp. 158–159.
 Authority, Liberty, and Function in the Light of the War, London: George Allen & Unwin, 1916.
 "Partnership and Fellowship," The New Age, Vol. XX, No. 12, 1916, pp. 272–274. 
 "On Love and Things," The New Age, Vol. XX, No. 15, 1917, p. 358.
 "The Principle of Nationality," The New Age, Vol. XX, No. 16, 1917, p. 366-367.

 "The Value of Nationality," The New Age, Vol. XX, No. 17, 1917, pp. 395–396.
 "The Wonders of Desolation," The New Age, Vol. XXI, No. 6, 1917, pp. 128–130.
 "The Value of 'Function'," The New Age, Vol. XXI, No. 6, 1917, p. 143.
 "Liberty and Pleasure," The New Age, Vol. XXI, No. 10, 1917, pp. 223–225.
 "Liberty and Morality," The New Age, Vol. XXI, No. 12, 1917, pp. 262–264.
 "The Fetish of Personality," The New Age, Vol. XXI, No. 14, 1917, pp. 301–303.
 "Personal v. Political Liberty," The New Age, Vol. XXI, No. 16, 1917, p. 344. 
 "Personal v. Political Liberty II," The New Age, Vol. XXI, No. 17, 1917, pp. 363–364. 
 "The Principle of Growth," The New Age, Vol. XXI, No. 19, 1917, pp. 402–404.
 "To Begin With," The New Age, Vol. XXI, No. 23, 1917, pp. 483–484.
 "The Functional Principle," The New Age, Vol. XXI, No. 25, 1917, pp. 526–527.
 "The Nature of Societies," The New Age, Vol. XXI, No. 26, 1917, pp. 542–543.
 "Function in Land," The New Age, Vol. XXII, No. 2, 1917, pp. 26–28.
 "Liberty and Democracy," The New Age, Vol. XXII, No. 6, 1917, pp. 107–109.
 "Old Worlds for New," The New Age, Vol. XXII, No. 6, 1917, pp. 132–133.
 "Tolstoy's Revolution," The New Age, Vol. XXII, No. 10, 1917, pp. 186–187.
 "The Formula of the War," The New Age, Vol. XXII, No. 14, 1917, pp. 266–267.
 "'Necessity' in Law," Inter-America, Vol. I, No. 1, 1917, pp. 31–34.
 "The Best of Both Worlds," The New Age, Vol. XXII, No. 16, 1918, pp. 306–307.
 "Land Power or Sea Power?," The New Age, Vol. XXII, No. 17, 1918, pp. 323–324.
 "Fate and Resignation," The New Age, Vol. XXII, No. 19, 1918, pp. 371–372.
 "The Russian Lesson for Industrial Democracy," The New Age, Vol. XXII, No. 22, 1918, p. 431. 
 "Dostoyevsky the Manichean," The New Age, Vol. XXII, No. 23, 1918, pp. 449–451.
 "Let Us Be Whole!," The New Age, Vol. XXII, No. 26, 1918, p. 497.
 "Function and Rights," The New Age, Vol. XXIII, No. 22, pp. 347–348.
 "Germany Now," The New Age, Vol. XXIV, No. 10, 1919, pp. 155–157.
 "East and West," The New Age, Vol. XXVII, No. 14, 1920, p. 212. 
 "On Earth as in Heaven," The New Age, Vol. XXVII, No. 21, 1920, pp. 308–309.
 "The War Diary of a Square Peg," The New Age, Vol. XXVII, No. 26, 1920, pp. 369–370.
 "The International Policy of Spain," Foreign Affairs, Vol. I, No. 2, 1922, pp. 136–143.
 "Automobiles and National Character," The Living Age, Vol. CCCXXII, No. 4185, 1924.
 "A Spaniard's Exposition of Spengler," The Living Age, Vol. CCCXXVII, No. 4241, 1925.
 "How to Make the Yankee Harmless," The Living Age, Vol. CCCXXVIII, No. 4264, 1926.

Further reading

 Blanco Aguinaga, Carlos (1970). Juventud del 98, Madrid: Siglo Veintiuno.
 Blas Guerrero, Andrés de (1993). La Ambigüedad Nacionalista de Ramiro de Maeztu, Institut de Ciències Polítiques i Socials.
 Cierva, Ricardo de la (1987). La Derecha sin Remedio (1801-1987), Barcelona: Plaza y Janes.
 Crawford, Susanna Wickham (1962). The Concept of Liberty in the Essays of Ramiro de Maeztu, Washington University.
 Fernandez-Barros, Enrique (1974). "Ramiro de Maeztu on Money and Wealth in America," Modern Age, Vol. XVIII, No. 1, pp. 53–63.
 Iribarne, Manuel Fraga (1976). Ramiro de Maeztu en Londres, Cultura Hispánica.
 Iribarne, Manuel Fraga (1981). El Pensamiento Conservador Español, Barcelona: Planeta.
 Flores, María José (2002). Ramiro de Maeztu y Whitney: Un Intelectual Herido Por España, Unipress.
 González Cuevas, Pedro Carlos (2005). El Pensamiento Político de la Derecha Española en el Siglo XX, Tecnos.
 Landeira, Ricardo (1978). Ramiro de Maeztu, Twayne Publishers.
 Marrero, Vicente (1955). Maetzu, Madrid: Rialp.
 Marrero, Vicente (1986). El P. Arintero y Ramiro de Maeztu, Editorial San Esteban.
 Nozick, Martin (1954). "An Examination of Ramiro de Maeztu," PMLA, Vol. 69, No. 4, pp. 719–740.
 Palacios Fernández, Emilio (1982). Ramiro de Maeztu, la Labor Literaria de un Periodista (1897-1910), Diputación Foral de Álava, Departamento de Publicaciones.
 Rocamora, Pedro (1974). "Ramiro de Maetzu y la Generación del 98," Arbor, Vol. 341, pp. 7–22.
 Valmala, Antonio de (1908). "Ramiro de Maeztu." In Los Voceros del Modernismo, Barcelona: Luis Gili.
 Villiers-Wardell, Janie (1909). Spain of the Spanish, New York: Charles Scribner's Sons.
 Wilson, Francis G. (1964). "Ramiro de Maeztu - Critic of the Revolution," Modern Age, Vol. VIII, No. 2 [Rep. in Order and Legitimacy: Political Thought in National Spain, Transaction Publishers, 2004].

Notes

External links

 Works by Ramiro de Maetzu, at Hathi Trust
 Works by Ramiro de Maetzu, at Biblioteca Nacional de España
 Articles by Ramiro de Maetzu, at Acción Española
 Ramiro de Maeztu 1875-1936
 Maeztu y la España del Catolicismo Integral

1875 births
1936 deaths
People from Vitoria-Gasteiz
Spanish Roman Catholics
Renovación Española politicians
Members of the Congress of Deputies of the Second Spanish Republic
Acción Española
Basque writers
Spanish people of the Spanish Civil War (National faction)
Roman Catholic writers
Spanish male writers
Members of the Royal Spanish Academy
Spanish people of English descent
People killed by the Second Spanish Republic
Extrajudicial killings
Executed Spanish people
Spanish political writers
Executed writers
Ambassadors of Spain to Argentina
Spanish nationalists
Far-right politicians in Spain
Distributism